Bamboo borer may refer to:

 Dinoderus minutus, a woodboring beetle native to Asia
 Omphisa fuscidentalis, a Southeast Asian moth, the larvae of which feed off bamboo and which are considered a delicacy by the local population